The University Center ("UC") is a major building that is part of The New School in New York, NY.

History

The 16-story building at 65 5th Avenue was officially opened in January 2014 and certified as a LEED Gold building. The tower, was designed by Skidmore, Owings and Merrill's Roger Duffy and is the biggest capital project The New School university has ever undertaken.

Criticism
The 65 Fifth Avenue plans were initially controversial among students and Village residents, which spurred a major student occupation in 2009 at the previous building on the site. After much back and forth with the community, the plans for the University Center were adjusted in response to major concerns. Since its erection, the building has been well-received. In a review of the building's final design, The New York Times architecture critic Nicolai Ouroussoff called the building "a celebration of the cosmopolitan city."

References

External links

Page on The New School official website

The New School
2014 establishments in New York City
Buildings and structures in Manhattan
Buildings and structures completed in 2014